Ragini Dwivedi (born 24 May 1990) is an Indian actress and model who works primarily in Kannada films.

She made her entry to filmdom with Veera Madakari (2009). She rose to fame starring in successful Kannada language films, Kempe Gowda (2011), Shiva (2012), Bangari (2013) and Ragini IPS (2014), thus establishing herself as one of the leading actresses in Kannada cinema until 2019.

Early life 
Dwivedi was born on 24 May in Mhow, Madhya Pradesh and was brought up there. However, she has her roots in Rewari, Haryana. Her father Rakesh Kumar Dwivedi, born in Rewari, was a Colonel in the Indian Army and her mother Rohini, a housewife. Her paternal grandfather Pyare Lal Dwivedi was a railway guard in Rewari.

She was recognised by fashion designer, Prasad Bidapa in 2008 and introduced her to modelling. As a model, she modelled for Lakme Fashion Week, Sri Lanka fashion week and for designers like Rohit Bal, Tarun Tahiliani, Manish Malhotra, Ritu Kumar and Sabyasachi Mukherjee. She participated in the Femina Miss India contest held in Hyderabad in December 2008, where she was declared the first runner-up, thus receiving a direct entry to the 2009 Pantaloons Femina Miss India in Mumbai, where she was given the Richfeel Miss Beautiful Hair title.

Career

Debut and breakthrough (2009–13) 
Dwivedi made her acting debut with the Kannada film Veera Madakari in 2009. The action-comedy was a remake of the Telugu film Vikramarkudu and she was cast opposite Sudeep. The film became a major commercial success of the year. In the same year, she appeared in the film Gokula in a brief role. In 2010, she featured in five films out of which her Malayalam debut, Kandhahar, was one.

Dwivedi's career break came in 2011, with the action film, Kempegowda, with Sudeep as her co-star. She earned a nomination in the South Filmfare awards as a best female leading actress. The same year saw her in comic-capers such as Kalla Malla Sulla and Kaanchaana. The song Thuppa Beku Thuppa in Kalla Malla Sulla shot on her became a rage and one of the biggest hits of the year.

The year 2012 saw her featuring in films alongside leading male actors of Kannada cinema, with Upendra in Aarakshaka and with Shivarajkumar in Shiva. She received the award for the best actress in the critics' category for her performance in Shiva as well as in Arakshaka her role was highly appreciated. Her other film Villain also released in the same year. She then appeared in a Malayalam language film titled Face2Face with Mammootty as her co-actor. She made special appearances in the films Victory and Prabhu Deva's  Hindi film, R... Rajkumar.

Recent work (2014–present) 
Dwivedi's first release of 2014 was a bilingual film known as Nimirndhu Nil in Tamil language and Janda Pai Kapiraju in Telugu, her first film in Telugu. Her second release of the year was Ragini IPS, the long delayed film. Cast as a police officer Ragini, the film marked her break from glamorous characters that she had a reputation for portraying. The film however opened to mixed reviews from film critics. However, it earned her, her second Filmfare Award for Best Actress nomination. Her next release was Namaste Madam, a remake of the 2002 Telugu film Missamma. Her performance as Radhika, chairperson of a multinational corporation playing as a seductress, received positive reviews from critics. Her first release of 2015, Shivam saw her appear in another glamorous role as a femme fatale, and as a parallel lead alongside Upendra.

As of April 2016, Dwivedi has completed filming Ranachandi is filming with Naane Next CM. She is also filming with Faisal Saif's multi-lingual film Amma. In preparation for her role in Naane Next CM, she shed 15 kg over a span of three months.

Personal life and off-screen work 
Since 2011, Dwivedi has been endorsing for Nandini Milk which is a product of Karnataka Milk Federation. After actress Khushbu, Dwivedi is the only Indian actress to have a fan club named after her, on which she said, "Already there are many fans pages in my name on social networking sites like Facebook and Twitter. I will also be interacting with my followers over there. But these registered and official fans association will help me to have direct conversation with my fans." 

In 2015, Dwivedi was made the brand ambassador of Times Asia Wedding Fair. The same year, at the India Leadership Conclave in Mumbai, she was honoured and awarded the Most Promising Face of Indian Cinema.

Ragini is passionate about the environment. She is brand ambassador of Hubballi Dharwad Municipal Corporation for the clean city campaign under the Swachh Bharat programme. She spoke about UV Index, alarming levels of UV and the need for environment initiatives.

Controversy

Drug trafficking case
The Central Crime Branch (CCB) on 4 September 2020, conducted raids at Ragini Dwivedi's residence in Bengaluru in connection to the Sandalwood drug racket case. The CCB had intensified its investigation into a drugs haul in Bengaluru after the Narcotics Control Bureau (NCB) arrested three people from the city, who were allegedly supplying drugs to singers and actors in the Kannada film industry. She was arrested on 4 September 2020, after nearly seven hours of  interrogation that happened at the CCB office. She and 11 other were charged  under various sections of IPC including criminal conspiracy and Narcotic Drugs and Psychotropic Substances Act, 1985.
 She was granted bail after spending 140 days in prison.

Filmography

References

External links 

 
 

1990 births
Living people
People from Mhow
Actresses from Madhya Pradesh
Female models from Madhya Pradesh
Indian film actresses
Actresses in Kannada cinema
Actresses in Tamil cinema
Actresses in Malayalam cinema
Actresses in Hindi cinema
Actresses in Telugu cinema
Indian prisoners and detainees
Prisoners and detainees of India
21st-century Indian actresses